Olive Wetzel Dennis (November 20, 1885 – November 5, 1957) was an engineer whose design innovations changed the nature of railway travel. Born in Thurlow, Pennsylvania, she grew up in Baltimore.

Career
She earned a Bachelor of Arts degree from Goucher College in 1908, and a master's degree in mathematics from Columbia University the following year. After teaching at Wisconsin, she decided to study civil engineering and studied at Cornell University, earning her degree in only one year. In 1920, she became only the second woman to obtain a Civil Engineering degree from Cornell  . She was hired that year as a draftsman by the B & O Railroad to design bridges, the first of which was in Painesville, Ohio. The following year, Daniel Willard, President of the railroad observed that, since half of the railway's passengers were women, the task of engineering upgrades in service would best be handled by a female engineer. Dennis became the first "service engineer" when the B. & O. created the position.  Engineering historian Kurt H. Debus described her as the first service engineer in America. Later on in her career, B. &. O. tasked Dennis with designing an entire train that incorporated all of her innovations. This train, the Cincinnatian, was deemed "the crowning glory of her career" by historian Sharon Harwood. She was also the first female member of the American Railway Engineering Association. She was elected as a member of the British Women's Engineering Society in 1931.

Innovations
Among the innovations that Ms. Dennis introduced on passenger trains were seats that could partially recline; stain-resistant upholstery in passenger cars; larger dressing rooms for women, supplied with free paper towels, liquid soap and drinking cups; ceiling lights that could be dimmed at night; individual window vents (which she patented) to allow passengers to bring in fresh air while trapping dust; and, later, air conditioned compartments. Other rail carriers followed suit in the years that followed, and buses and airlines, in turn, had to upgrade their level of comfort in order to compete with the railroads.

Her legacy for these innovations and comforts goes largely unknown outside of the railroad community. Her design patents were signed over to the railroad and her name does not appear in the publicity materials for the Cincinnatian, despite her designing it.

Woman's viewpoint
"No matter how successful a business may seem to be," she said, "it can gain even greater success if it gives consideration to the woman's viewpoint."  Although the changes were not enough to save the passenger rail industry in America, Ms. Dennis' unique perspective as a traveling woman with training as a technical engineer influenced the travel industry nationwide.

Sources
Current Biography 1941 yearbook, pp. 220–221
Sybil E. Hatch, Changing Our World: True Stories of Women Engineers (ASCE Publications, 2006)
Marilyn Bailey Ogilvie and Joy Dorothy Harvey, eds., The Biographical Dictionary of Women in Science (Taylor & Francis, 2000)

References

External links
 Olive Dennis - Engineer Girl
 Olive W. Dennis - B&O Railroad Museum
 Olive Dennis - Engineers of the Past profile
 Goucher College and Olive Dennis

American civil engineers
Goucher College alumni
Cornell University College of Engineering alumni
1957 deaths
1885 births
People from Baltimore
Baltimore and Ohio Railroad people
Women inventors
Engineers from Pennsylvania
Engineers from Maryland
20th-century American engineers
American women engineers
20th-century women engineers
20th-century American inventors
Women's Engineering Society
20th-century American women